Thomas Hampson (2 May 1898 – after 1929) was an English professional association footballer who played as a goalkeeper.

Born in Bury, Hampson began his career at South Shields but was unable to break into the first team. In 1920 he joined West Ham United as understudy to Ted Hufton, making 70 appearances before moving to Blackburn Rovers. Following short spells at Burnley and Darlington, Hampson signed for Cardiff City but was again unable to hold down a regular place, due to the presence of Tom Farquharson, and left the side in 1929 moving into non-league football after making one appearance for Notts County.

Personal life 
Hampson was the brother of footballers Billy and Walker Hampson.

References

1898 births
Footballers from Bury, Greater Manchester
English footballers
Association football defenders
West Ham United F.C. players
Blackburn Rovers F.C. players
Burnley F.C. players
Darlington F.C. players
Cardiff City F.C. players
Notts County F.C. players
English Football League players
Year of death missing
Association football goalkeepers